Dark Shadows: Clothes of Sand is a Big Finish Productions original dramatic reading based on the long-running American horror soap opera series Dark Shadows.

Plot 
From the Big Finish website:
"When Maggie Evans is take to the Windcliff Institute, she begins her recovery from the ordeal she suffered at the hands of Barnabas Collins. As she undergoes hypnosis, disturbing memories of her childhood being to surface. Who was the imaginary friend who once watched over her, and what threat does he prose for Maggie's future?"

Cast
Maggie Evans – Kathryn Leigh Scott
The Sandman – Alec Newman

External links
Dark Shadows - Clothes of Sand

Dark Shadows audio plays
2008 audio plays